This is a list of seasons played by Inverness Caledonian Thistle Football Club in Scottish football from their formation in 1994, following the merger of Caledonian and Inverness Thistle.

Seasons

Key

 Pld = Played
 W = Games won
 D = Games drawn
 L = Games lost
 GF = Goals for
 GA = Goals against
 GD = Goal difference
 Pts = Points
 P = Final position

 NE = Not Eligible
 NH = Not Held
 DNP = Did Not Participate
 1Q = First Qualifying Round
 2Q = Second Qualifying Round
 3Q = Third Qualifying Round
 POR = Play-Off Round
 GRP = Group Stage
 R1 = Round 1
 R2 = Round 2
 R3 = Round 3
 R4 = Round 4
 R5 = Round 5
 QF = Quarter-finals
 SF = Semi-finals
 F = Final
 Premiership = Scottish Premiership
Championship = Scottish Championship
 SPL    = Scottish Premier League
 SFL 1 = Scottish First Division
 SFL 2 = Scottish Second Division
 SFL 3 = Scottish Third Division

Footnotes

References 

Seasons
 
Seasons
Inverness Caledonian Thistle